Chunavia is the name of coastal region in central Albania and former bishopric in the country, now a Latin Catholic titular see. Chunavia was one of the oldest medieval bishoprics in Albania. It is the coastal region between Durrës and the mouth of the Mat (near Fushë Kuqe).

History 
The city in the former Roman province of Epirus Nova was important enough to become a suffragan of its capital Durrës's Metropolitan see circa 1300 AD, known in Latin as Cunavia, only to be suppressed again circa 1470.

Titular see 
The diocese was nominally restored in 1933 as a titular bishopric.

It has had the following incumbents, of the lowest (episcopal) rank :
 Joseph Brendan Houlihan, Saint Patrick's Society for the Foreign Missions (S.P.S.) (1970.10.19 – 1971.04.24)
 André Gustave Bossuyt (1971.08.03 – 1974.07.30)
 Szilárd Keresztes (1975.01.07 – 1988.06.30)
 Guy Marie Alexandre Thomazeau (1988.11.12 – 1994.09.14) as Auxiliary Bishop of Meaux (France) (1988.11.12 – 1994.09.14), later Coadjutor Bishop of Beauvais (France) (1994.09.14 – 1995.05.13) succeeding as Bishop of Beauvais (1995.05.13 – 2002.08.28), Bishop of Montpellier (France) (2002.08.28 – 2002.12.08), promoted Metropolitan Archbishop of Montpellier (2002.12.08 – 2011.06.03), Apostolic Administrator of Nice (France) (2013.08.08 – 2014.03.06)
 Murphy Nicholas Xavier Pakiam (1995.04.01 – 2003.05.24) as Auxiliary Bishop of Kuala Lumpur (1995.04.01 – 2003.05.24), later succeeding as Metropolitan Archbishop of Kuala Lumpur (Malaysia) (2003.05.24 – 2013.12.13), also President of Catholic Bishops’ Conference of Malaysia, Singapore and Brunei (2007.02 – 2011.01.01), Vice-President of Catholic Bishops’ Conference of Malaysia, Singapore and Brunei (2012.08? – ...)
 Walter Allison Hurley (2003.07.07 – 2005.06.21)
 David Christopher McGough (2005.10.25 – ...), Auxiliary Bishop of Birmingham (England)

Sources

Bibliography
 GigaCatholic with titular incumbent biography links

Catholic titular sees in Europe